The IX Gymnasium "Mihailo Petrović-Alas" is a gymnasium located in New Belgrade, Serbia, established in 1961, and named after the Serbian mathematician Mihailo Petrović-Alas.

Public reputation
The school has a reputation of being very academically demanding, with high entry standards: for example, in 2005, an applicant needed a score of at least 96 out of 100 points on the Serbian High school examination to enroll in the school, the highest score of any high school in Belgrade that year.

The school has earned an excellent reputation over many decades and has been called a philosophical school since Đinđić's schooldays because of its liberal-humanistic atmosphere.

Complete reconstruction of the gymnasium was announced in 2021.

Notable alumni

Zoran Đinđić, Prime Minister of Serbia 2001-2003
Dragan Đilas, Mayor of Belgrade
Čedomir Jovanović, Serbian politician; started his high-school career in the IXth gymnasium, but then transferred to Treća ekonomska school
Verica Rakocević, fashion designer 
Igor Rakočević, basketball player
Vanja Bulić, journalist
Marica Josimčević, writer
Neda Arnerić, actress
Ivana Maksimović, sport shooter
Stefan Arsenijević, Film director
Saša M.Savić, Artist
Mihajlo Veruović Voyage, rapper and actor

Gallery

See also
Gymnasium (school)
New Belgrade
The Zemun Gymnasium

References

Education in Belgrade
Educational institutions established in 1961
Gymnasiums in Belgrade
New Belgrade
1961 establishments in Yugoslavia